Jack Elliott (born 25 August 1995) is an English professional footballer who plays as a centre-back for the Philadelphia Union of Major League Soccer.

Youth
Elliott was born in London, England to Scottish parents. Attending Wilson's School in Wallington, he spent a year playing for Fulham at the age of 12 before being scouted by West Virginia University whilst playing in the Surrey Senior Cup.

Playing career

College and amateur
Elliott played four years of college soccer at West Virginia University between 2013 and 2017.

He also played in the Premier Development League for South Florida Surf in 2016.

Club

Philadelphia Union
On 17 January 2017, Elliott was drafted in the fourth round (77th overall) of the 2017 MLS SuperDraft by Philadelphia Union. He signed with Philadelphia on 24 February 2017. Elliott made his professional debut for the Union on 1 April as a substitute for Richie Marquez against D.C. United. Elliott became a regular starter for the Union through the rest of the season earning 30 appearances; 29 as a starter. He scored his first professional goal against San Jose Earthquakes, the first equalizer of an ultimate 2–2 away draw. Elliott's first season contributions earned him a nomination for the 2017 MLS Rookie of the Year award, but ultimately finished third in the running behind Abu Danladi and winner Julian Gressel.

During his first two seasons with the Union, Elliott earned two starts with Bethlehem Steel FC, the Union's second division team. Elliott scored his first brace for the Union during the 2018 season in a 3–2 win over the New England Revolution. During the 2019 season, Elliott developed a steady partnership next to the rotation of Union homegrown centerbacks Auston Trusty and Mark McKenzie, starting every match in the season. In May 2019, he was awarded a new contract with the Union through 2021 with an option for 2022. During the Union's opening playoff match of the 2019 season, he scored the second goal in a 4–3 comeback victory against New York Red Bulls, the first playoff win in club history.

The 2020 season, while disrupted by the COVID-19 pandemic, earned Elliott's and the Union's first trophy winning the 2020 Supporters' Shield.

Career statistics

Honors
Philadelphia Union
Supporters' Shield: 2020

References

External links

West Virginia bio

1995 births
Living people
English footballers
English people of Scottish descent
English expatriate footballers
West Virginia Mountaineers men's soccer players
South Florida Surf players
Philadelphia Union players
Philadelphia Union II players
Association football defenders
Expatriate soccer players in the United States
Philadelphia Union draft picks
USL League Two players
Major League Soccer players
USL Championship players
English expatriate sportspeople in the United States
Footballers from Greater London